Corina-Isabela Peptan (born March 17, 1978) is a Romanian chess player holding the titles of International Master (IM) and Woman Grandmaster (WGM). 

She was world girls' champion in several age categories: Under 10 in Timișoara 1988, Under 12 in Fond du Lac 1990, Under 14 in Warsaw 1991, and Under 18 in Guarapuava 1995.

Peptan won the Romanian women's championship twelve times (1994, 1995, 1997, 2000, 2004, 2007, 2008, 2009, 2014, 2015, 2017 and 2019). She competed in the Women's World Chess Championship in 2000, 2001 and 2004. She reached the quarterfinals in 2000.

In team events, Peptan has represented Romania in the Women's Chess Olympiad, Women's European Team Chess Championship, Women's Chess Balkaniads and Girls' Chess Balkaniads. She has won two individual silver medals at the olympiad, in Moscow 1994 (playing board three) and Calvià 2004 (board two). In the European Club Cup for Women, she played for the victorious team AEM-Luxten Timișoara in 1998.

References

External links
 
 Corina Peptan chess games at 365Chess.com
 

1978 births
Living people
Chess International Masters
Chess woman grandmasters
Chess Olympiad competitors
Romanian female chess players
World Youth Chess Champions
People from Gorj County